Charles Yu Hsingling (11 January 1879?), often referred to as Charles Hsingling, was a Hanjun Plain White bannerman who served as second secretary in the Qing-dynasty Embassy in France. He was also an engineer worked for the Qing imperial railways.

Biography 

He had three siblings, the elder brother John Yu Shuinling, two younger sisters, Lizzie Yu Der Ling and Nellie Yu Roung Ling.

He was a Roman Catholic baptised at the wish of his mother, and, like his siblings, received Western education in American missionary school. The British diplomat Sir Robert Hart described them as "a noisy family of English-speaking children, were fluent also in Japanese and French".

From 1899 to 1902, he served as second secretary in the Qing-dynasty Embassy in France, where his father held a diplomatic post. The Yu siblings led a cosmopolitan life in Paris, they socialised, frequented the theatre and performed at their parents' parties. The weekly magazine  reported that the four children of Minister Yu Keng "superbly performed" an English comedy in three acts at a soirée organised by their father.

In March 1901, the Yus threw a fancy dress ball at the Chinese Embassy to celebrate Chinese New Year, at which Hsingling was costumed as Napoleon, his siblings Shuinling, Roung Ling and Der Ling, were dressed respectively as Pluto, Prince Charming and a doll in the fairy tale.

He married Geneviève Deneu, a French piano teacher. Not much is known about his later life.

References 

1879 births
Date of death unknown
Qing dynasty diplomats
Chinese diplomats
19th-century Chinese engineers
20th-century Chinese engineers
Chinese Roman Catholics
Chinese people of American descent
Han Chinese Plain White Bannermen